Guthrie is a former unincorporated community located in the village of Vernon, Waukesha County, Wisconsin, United States. The community was named for its first postmaster, Charles R. Guthrie, who opened the post office in January 1896.

Notes

Unincorporated communities in Waukesha County, Wisconsin
Unincorporated communities in Wisconsin